Ramoth or Remeth may refer to:
 one of several places in ancient Israel:
 Ramoth-Gilead, a Levite city of refuge
 Baalath-Beer, also known as Ramoth of the South, a city of the tribe of Simeon
 Ramoth (Issachar), a Levite city in the tribe of Issachar
 Ramoth (dragon), a fictional dragon in Anne McCaffrey's Dragonriders of Pern books
 Ramoth Chapel, Hirwaun, Rhondda Cynon Taf, Wales

See also
 Ramah (ancient Israel)